Mogau Motlhatswi (born July 13, 1992)is a South African actress popularly known for her role as Mapitsi Magongwa, the baby mama and wife of Thabo Maputla (Cornet Mamabolo) in the soap opera, Skeem Saam.

Early life
Earlier life and education
Mogau Motlhatswi was born and raised at Mogoto village suitated at Limpopo province.
She attended Brixton’s Piet van Vuuren Primary School during her time at school she was involved in athletics sport activities before she went St. Mary’s High School where she got matriculated.

Mogau attended the University of Johannesburg where she studied audiovisual communication.

Career
She is currently acting on Skeem Saam . She has also acted in MTVShuga

Television role

In Skeem Saam'', she plays Mapitisi, Alfred Mawongwa's niece. She is also the sister of Sonti Mawongwa and the mother to Pitsi. She is in a relationship with Thabo Maputla, who is Pitsi’s father.

References

1992 births
Living people
People from Lepelle-Nkumpi Local Municipality
South African actresses
University of Johannesburg alumni